George Wilkinson (3 March 1879 – 7 August 1946) was an English water polo player who competed at the 1908 and 1912 Summer Olympics representing Great Britain. He was in the Hyde Seal team when he won the Olympics. Hyde Seal are a Manchester team. He was part of the British water polo team and won two gold medals. The International Olympic Committee credits him with a third gold medal from the 1900 Games, but this is incorrect as he was in England during the tournament.

See also
 Great Britain men's Olympic water polo team records and statistics
 List of Olympic champions in men's water polo
 List of Olympic medalists in water polo (men)
 List of members of the International Swimming Hall of Fame

References

External links

 

1879 births
1946 deaths
English male water polo players
Water polo players at the 1908 Summer Olympics
Water polo players at the 1912 Summer Olympics
Olympic water polo players of Great Britain
English Olympic medallists
Olympic gold medallists for Great Britain
Olympic medalists in water polo
Medalists at the 1912 Summer Olympics
Medalists at the 1908 Summer Olympics